Houjie is a town under the jurisdiction of the prefecture-level city of Dongguan, Guangdong, China.

Toponymy 
When the area was first established during the Southern Song dynasty, it was known as Houjie, since one well-known traveler chose to reside in a location behind a major building in town. Later, the town chose to change the first character, as another character pronounced hou was used in words meaning honest and kind and abundant.

History 
Houjie was built as a village in 1122.

In 1957, Houjie became a township, but was changed to a people's commune one year later. In 1983, the Houjie People's Commune was abolished, and Houjie became a district. In 1987, it became a town, which it remains to this date.

Geography
The area is part of the Guangdong–Hong Kong–Macau Greater Bay Area on the Pearl River Delta.

The  is located in Houjie.

It borders the town of Humen to the south, and Dongguan's urban center to the north.

Administrative divisions 
Houjie administers the following 24 residential communities:

 Zhuxi Community
 Houjie Community
 Shanmei Community
 Liaosha Community
 Hetian Community
 Tingshan Community
 Huangang Community
 Santun Community
 Baotun Community
 Chenwu Community
 Chiling Community
 Qiaotou Community
 Nanwu Community
 Xitou Community
 Shatang Community
 Baotang Community
 Xiabian Community
 Baihao Community
 Xintang Community
 Shuanggang Community
 Yongkou Community
 Dajing Community
 Xinwei Community
 Hujing Community

Demographics 
According to the 2000 Chinese Census, 368,038 people were permanent residents of Houjie. However, in 2008, the town had a registered hukou population of just 95,055. This vast difference is likely a result of large-scale migration from more rural areas, resulting in large amounts of people with hukou registration in their previous residences.

Economy

As of 2020, Houjie's gross domestic product (GDP) totaled 41.572 billion RMB. The same year, consumer retail sales in Houjie totaled 7.246 billion RMB. Major companies with operations in Houjie include Samsung and Tyco.

Major products produced in Houjie include furniture, electromechanical equipment, footwear, and jewelry. The town also produces Guancao (Dongguan Grass) and sausages. Due to reform and opening up, the town industrialized and urbanized. In recent years, it has been successfully honored as a "Town of Hygiene in China", "Famous Town of Exhibitions in China", "Town with the Strongest Education in Guangdong", and a "Civilized Town of Dongguan City".

According to the town government, Houjie is home to more than 270 restaurants, and more than 130 hotels.

Houjie is famous with for its shoe design and manufacturing center, mainly focused on branded shoes.

In 1998, American labor activist Charles Kernaghan documented the scenes of the Liang Shi Handbag Factory, a sweatshop located in Houjie. He found that this factory paid wages as low as 0.13 USD per hour, made their employees work 10 hour shifts six or seven days per week, failed to fully pay employees, lacked any sort of fire exits, and housed their workers in cramped and dirty dorm rooms which were under 24 hour surveillance. The factory mostly employed young women migrant workers hailing from rural regions. This expose received major attention in the American press, due to the fact that it was one of the sweatshops producing handbags branded by American celebrity Kathie Lee Gifford.

Transportation 
The Beijing–Hong Kong and Macau Expressway runs through Houjie.

Tourism 

References

External links

 
 Satellite view of HouJie in Google Maps

Geography of Dongguan

Towns in Guangdong